Jean-Michel Jacques (born in 1968) is a French politician representing La République En Marche! He was elected to the French National Assembly on 18 June 2017, representing the department of Morbihan.

Early life and career
Born in 1968 in Metz, he grew up in Hagondange, a small town in Moselle. In 1988, at 18 years-old, he joined the French Navy were he specialized in military nursing, and passed selection for the French Commandos Marine, the Special Operation Forces of the French Navy.

He is deputy-president of the National Defence and Armed Forces Committee at the French National Assembly, member of the Parliamentary Assembly of the Organization for Security and Co-operation in Europe, and President of the "Major crisis and risks management" study group.

He was re-elected in the 2022 French legislative election.

See also
 2017 French legislative election

References

1968 births
Living people
Deputies of the 15th National Assembly of the French Fifth Republic
La République En Marche! politicians
Recipients of the Meritorious Service Medal (United States)

Deputies of the 16th National Assembly of the French Fifth Republic
21st-century French politicians
French Navy personnel